James Bowling Mozley (15 September 1813 – 4 January 1878) was an English theologian.

He was born at Gainsborough, Lincolnshire, the younger brother of Thomas Mozley, and was educated at Queen Elizabeth's Grammar School (now Queen Elizabeth's High School, Gainsborough) and later Oriel College, Oxford.

Mozley was elected to a fellowship at Magdalen in 1840. He took an active part in the Oxford Movement.  He said he could no more follow John Henry Newman, his brother-in-law, into the Roman communion "than fly."  He was joint editor of the Christian Remembrancer.  He withdrew from the position because of his substantial agreement with the famous Gorham decision.

Mozley was one of the earliest supporters of The Guardian, the High Church weekly. In 1856 he became vicar of Shoreham, in 1869 canon of Worcester, and in 1871 regius professor of divinity at Oxford.

He died at Shoreham on 4 January 1878.

Works
A Treatise on the Augustinian Doctrine of Predestination (1855)
The Primitive Doctrine of Baptismal Regeneration (1856)
A Review of the Baptismal Controversy (1862)
Subscription to the Articles: a Letter (1863)
Lectures on Miracles, being the Bampton Lectures for 1865
Ruling Ideas in Early Ages and their relation to the Old Testament Faith (1877)
Essays, Historical and Theological, appeared in 1878 (2 vols), with a biographical preface by his sister Anne, who also edited some of his Letters (1884).

References

Andrew C. Mead, "J. B. Mozley and the Development of Doctrine" (B.Litt. thesis, Keble College, Oxford, 1973). In the Bodleian Library.

External links

 
 The grave of James Bowling Mozley and his wife Amelia in St Sepulchre's Cemetery, Oxford, with biography

1813 births
1878 deaths
English Anglo-Catholics
19th-century English theologians
People from Gainsborough, Lincolnshire
Alumni of Oriel College, Oxford
Fellows of Magdalen College, Oxford
People educated at Queen Elizabeth's High School
Regius Professors of Divinity (University of Oxford)
English male non-fiction writers
English Anglican theologians
19th-century English Anglican priests
Anglo-Catholic clergy
Anglo-Catholic theologians
19th-century English male writers
Burials at St Sepulchre's Cemetery